Razor Sharp may refer to:

Razor Sharp Records, List of Wu-Recording record labels 
Razor Sharp Victoria's Secret Fashion Show 2003
Jim "Razor" Sharp (1965) American retired professional bull rider native to West Texas
"Razor Sharp", song by Pegboard Nerds and Tristam